Come Come Come Baby is the third Korean-language studio album by South Korean girl group Baby V.O.X. It was released on July 22, 1999, by DR Music. The album earned them the Top Excellency Award at the 1999 Seoul Music Awards. The album sold over 200,000 copies in South Korea.

Track listing 
 Intro
 Get up
 Missing You
 Killer
 꽃무늬 비키니
 사랑해요
 Mask
 하늘과 함께한 사랑
 Summer Story
 웃어요
 Love and Ecstasy
 Get up-Mr

Personnel 
Kim E-Z
Shim Eun-Jin
Kan Mi-Youn
Yoon Eun-Hye
Lee Hee-Jin

DR Music albums
1999 albums
Baby V.O.X. albums